Kaliova Nauqe Tani is a Fijian rugby league footballer who represented Fiji in the 2008 World Cup.

At the time he represented the Fassifern RLFC.

He was selected in the squad for the 2013 Rugby League World Cup.

References

1985 births
Fijian rugby league players
Fiji national rugby league team players
Rugby league five-eighths
Ipswich Jets players
Rugby league halfbacks
Living people